Marita Hynes Field at OU Softball Complex is a college softball stadium on the campus of the University of Oklahoma.  It is the home venue of the Oklahoma Sooners softball team.  The playing surface was named for Marita Hynes on April 24, 2004. Hynes served as the second head coach of the Sooners and later as Senior Women's Administrator, and was instrumental in fundraising for the stadium.

The stadium was completed in 1998, and includes seating for 1,378.  In 2005, the playing surface was named for Hynes, and in 2009 a player development facility was added.

Due to high demand for tickets, the University announced plans for a new stadium in 2018, with fundraising for the new 3,000-seat stadium underway as of 2019.  In 2021, Oklahoma City-based Love's Travel Stops announced a $9 million donation (plus an agreement to match dollar-for-dollar an additional $3 million of donations) for the new field, which in turn will be named Love's Field.

References

College softball venues in the United States
Oklahoma Sooners softball
Softball venues in Oklahoma